Jonathan Beaulieu (born 11 March 1993) is a French professional footballer who plays as a midfielder.

Career
Born in Meudon, Jonathan started his professional career with Caen.
On 27 August 2013, he made his professional debut, coming as a substitute in a 3–0 home loss to Auxerre in the Coupe de la Ligue.

References

External links
 Profile
 
 

1993 births
Living people
Association football midfielders
French footballers
Stade Malherbe Caen players
US Granville players
FC Chambly Oise players
Ligue 2 players
Championnat National players
Championnat National 2 players
Championnat National 3 players